The 70 Series is a family of Toyota Land Cruiser models produced since 1984.  It replaced the 25-year-old 40 Series as the off-road model of the Land Cruiser lineup, while the contemporary 60 Series developed into more comfortable luxury SUVs starting with the 80 Series. Despite major changes in styling and numerous technological updates, the 70 Series was designed to retain the off-road capabilities and durability associated with the 40 Series. The 70 Series is marketed throughout the world, except for countries like India, the United States, Mexico, Brazil and Korea where they were imported and put into commercial or private use.

Model designations 
Originally, model numbers 70 through 74 referred to the two-door short- and medium-wheelbase versions. These were the successors of the 40 Series, such as the FJ40. Model numbers 75, 78 and 79 referred to the long-wheelbase version, which was available in pickup and two-door troop carrier models. These were the successors of the less-well known long-wheelbase 40 Series, such as the FJ45. Models 77 (1990–1999 JDM) and 76 are a semi-long wheelbase four-door wagon in a few markets.

In 1999, Toyota introduced several updates and changed the model designations, where the long-wheelbase models became the 78 (troop carrier) and 79 (pickup). In 2007, the 76 (four-door wagon) was added, while the new dual-cab models also share the 79 model designation (essentially the same chassis). Short-wheelbase models are only in production today for a few select markets.

As with all Land Cruisers, the letters at the beginning of the model number designate the engine of the vehicle.  Common engines in the 70 series include the 3F petrol engine (e.g., the FJ70), the 22R petrol engine (e.g. the RJ70/73 Bundera), the 2H diesel engine (e.g., the HJ75), the 1FZ petrol engine (e.g., the FZJ70/71/73/74/75/76/78/79), the 1PZ diesel engine (e.g., the PZJ70/73/77), the 1HZ diesel engine (e.g., the HZJ70/71/73/74/75/76/77/78/79), the 1HD diesel engine (e.g. the HDJ78/79), and most recently, the 1VD diesel engine (e.g., the VDJ76). For a while (1987 until at least 1990) the BJ73 hardtop was available in the Italian and Spanish markets with a VM five-cylinder HR588 2.5-litre turbodiesel—the "B" prefix was applied because the first four-cylinder diesel 70 series came with the 3B.

History
1984–1999: The 70 / 75 series Toyota Land Cruiser took over from the 40 / 45 series of workhorse four-wheel drives in 1984. The styling maintained a family resemblance to the 40 / 45 series but became more angular. The 70 / 71 series was the short-wheelbase (SWB), the 73 / 74 was the medium-wheelbase (MWB) and the 75 / 77 was the long-wheelbase (LWB). The latter came as cab-chassis/utility with a "panelled" tray (pickup), and "troop carrier" hard-top (HT).  Toyota also manufactured lighter duty versions that shared the 70 Series designation from 1985 to 1996, and were marketed in various parts of the world initially as the Bundera, or Land Cruiser II and later as the Prado.  Of these, the Prado name stuck, and each modification took it further from its 70 Series roots. Starting in 1997 the Prado was known as the 90 Series, and had become a passenger 4x4 with no relation to the 70 Series.

1999: The pickup version was designated the 79 series, the Troop Carrier became the 78 series, and the short-wheelbase version was phased out in most markets.  The principal mechanical changes were: coil spring (instead of leaf spring) live front axle; longer rear leaf springs; 5-bolt wheels instead of 6-bolt wheels; redesigned steering wheel; redesigned front indicators; and, in the cab-chassis, a longer wheelbase, which increased the rear storage capacity.

2007: The facelifted 70 Series began production in January for market release in late February / early March 2007. Changes involve significant modifications to the front end design, eliminating the trademark flat fenders featured on all commercial Land Cruiser series' since the 40 series. This change along with a wider front axle/track and wider chassis were required to allow fitment of the new Euro-4 compliant 4.5L V8 turbo diesel, the 1VD-FTV. This engine was initially just for the Australian market, where it was the only engine available. Africa and other markets continued with straight-6 petrol and 1HZ diesel engines. In order to fill the hole left by the elimination of lower-specification models in the 100-series and 200-series ranges, a 4-door wagon variant (The 76 series) was introduced alongside the long-running cab-chassis (79 series) and Troop Carrier (78 series) bodies. For the first time a higher GXL specification level was also introduced in some markets for the cab-chassis and wagon variants. This specification level added numerous additional comfort and safety features never previously seen on commercial series Land Cruisers. In 2007 they were made in Venezuela the 50th anniversary version, came with bumper, gasoline bottle, rear blockers, winch, stirrups. Only 300 were made.

2009: Venezuela's President Hugo Chávez threatened to expropriate Toyota's plants in that country if Toyota and other car makers refused to share their technology with local businesses and meet certain quotas. The 70 series Land Cruiser is used throughout Venezuela for the transportation community, the police, and the National Guard of Venezuela.

2009: The 1FZ/1FZ-FE engine was replaced by the 4.0L 1GR-FE in the markets where petrol-powered versions are available, such as Bolivia, Colombia and the Middle East.

2012: Toyota introduced a double-cabin HZJ79 pickup body type, combining the longer 3180 mm wheelbase of the previous two-door pickup with the four doors and single, 130-litre fuel tank of the wagon body types.

2014: Toyota introduced the 4-door wagon GRJ76 and double-cabin GRJ79 pickup body in the Japan market as a limited-edition '30th Anniversary' Series 70 for a 12-month run. This model came with the 1GR-FE V6 petrol engine and 5 speed manual transmission. This model was on limited sale in Japan only until June 2015 when Japanese law required all new vehicles to come with Vehicle Skid Control, something the 70 Series does not have.

2015: The Land Cruiser 70 started production by Salvador Caetano in Ovar, Portugal in an updated version from mid 2015 onwards for export to the African market, Morocco in particular. However, the model won't be reintroduced to the European market because its engines are not emissions-certified in Europe. This is in spite of the 1VD-FTE being available for the Land Cruiser 200 in a twin-turbo version. The Portuguese-built Land Cruisers have a  engine and a five-speed manual transmission. Production initially consisted of a five-door station wagon and a double-cab pickup.

2022: Ongoing modifications have brought the 70 series abreast of ratcheting safety and environmental regulation. The 2022 model for Australia meets Euro 5 emissions standards, while accommodating front and side airbags (a significant task given the rigid ladder frame) and frame strengthening to meet side impact requirements. The Land Cruiser 76 wagon was reintroduced earlier taking advantage of these safety improvements, in early 2021 it accounted for more than half of 70 series Australian private sales.

Features

Square-bodied Land Cruiser utility 4x4. Two or four doors with steel doors and top, slanted windshield. The front-clip styling remains much like that of the 40 Series. The grille can be mesh or can consist of three horizontal bars.

Both have three additional horizontal slots in a single line under the grille. Front turn signals are square with triangular white lens elements underneath, and are affixed to the vertical edge of the front clip above the fenders and just outboard of each headlight. The top can be hard or soft. The doors are hard, with roll-up windows. Taillights are long, vertical rectangles inset low into the rear bodywork. Rear doors are paired swing-out 'barn doors'. Windshields of some military versions will fold atop hood. It is available in many forms, including a four-door semi-long (J77V → J76V), a pickup (J75P → J79P), and long-wheelbase utility wagon (J75V → J77V / J78V).

With the exception of a few light-duty models that evolved into the Prado, all 70 Series Land Cruisers have solid leaf-sprung rear axles.  Solid front axles were leaf-sprung until 1998, when Toyota decided in favor of a coil spring front suspension with leading arms, and a slightly lighter front axle.  Also beginning in 1999 the rear leaf springs were extended to allow for greater wheel travel (articulation) and increased ride comfort.

Most 70 Series Land Cruisers (both petrol and diesel models) use inline six-cylinder engines. The exceptions are the V8 diesel 1VD-FTV engine introduced in some markets in 2007 and the V6 petrol 1GR-FE introduced in 2009, with the last straight-6 available being the diesel 1HZ for markets with less stringent emission rules such as Africa and Bolivia. Regardless of the engine, a 5-speed manual transmission delivers power to a part-time four-wheel-drive transfer case with high and low range. The solid front axles are a full-floating design with manual locking hubs. The solid rear axles are available in semi-floating and full-floating variations. Selectable locking differentials (front and rear) are factory options in some markets.

Basic comfort features such as air-conditioning and radio are available, but the 70 Series lacks many of the refined and luxury features of the more expensive passenger Land Cruisers (80, 90, 100, and 200 Series). 70-series Land Cruisers were usually fitted with manual transmissions, although a four-speed automatic was available on select versions like the FJ73 (1985–1992), the BJ74, the HZJ73/77 (1990–1999), and the HZJ74/76K (1999–2004).

Short wheelbase models

The suspension, interior and basic layout of these models are nearly identical to the more famous longer wheelbase 75 series Land Cruisers, but the frame and body is much shorter. This allows the Land Cruiser to be more nimble off-road. This model was popular as a personal off-road transport, but because the Land Cruiser was marketed almost exclusively as a commercial and government vehicle and because these were never sold in the US, few were built, compared to other Land Cruiser models.

However, these models were sold all over the world in the 1980s and early 1990s. They can be found in Japan, Asia, Africa, Europe, the Middle East, New Zealand and South America. The short-wheelbase models are not quite as common in Australia, but they are very popular in the homeland of Japan, where compactness and rugged 4X4 are a welcome combination; they are also used by the Syrian state. Today, few short-wheelbase 70 series can be purchased new—some are still in production today in some select South American countries and is still being produced by Toyota Auto Body at the Yoshiwara Plant in Toyota City.

For the North American market, the 70 series was only sold in small numbers. In 1984–1987 (model years 1985–1987), the BJ70 was sold in small numbers in Canada. Available engine choices were the 3B 4-cylinder diesel engine or the later 13BT turbocharged variant of the 3B. The 1985 version had a 12-volt electrical system which was changed late-1985 production (for the 1986 model year) to a 24-volt system in the diesel powered versions to meet international NATO specifications for a 24V starting system.

, the 70 series models are still available in Canada, accessible only to the mining industry through Toyota Industrial Sales Canada represented by vendors in Saskatoon, Sudbury and Quebec. The 70 series was not offered for sale in the United States.

, the updated long wheel base HZJ79 is available both as a cab and chassis, or as a completed GCC model with a box, ABS, airbags and available differential lockers.

Al-Thalab
In 1999, UK-based engineering company Jankel entered into a collaborative venture with the King Abdullah Design and Development Bureau of Jordan ("KADDB"). The Jordan Light Vehicle Manufacturing (JLVM) joint-venture was an initial  motor vehicle factory, to enable Jankel to reduce the cost of manufacture of its UK-engineered protective and light-combat vehicles. Soon after opening JLVM, Jankel began creating various up-armoured versions of the Land Cruiser 79 long wheel base vehicle, and in 2000 secured a contract with the United Nations to provide protected versions of the Land Cruiser 79.

In 2000, Jankel began designing a Long Range Patrol Vehicle (LRPV) to provide a capable and reliable patrolling platform. The Land Cruiser 79 chassis base was chosen as it is: common in most countries worldwide; not overly reliant on electronic management systems; mechanical components are of a basic design, enabling field repairs with standard automotive parts; a high-chassis weight loading capability; resulting in a vehicle which could be sustained in-field over long periods in remote areas, with limited or no support. Designed for patrol missions, internal security, reconnaissance and border patrol forces, it was field tested in the UK and Jordan, and first produced from 2005. The Al-Thalab can in base form accommodate up to four crew members,  of equipment, and comes equipped with three firing bases, two base stations for radios and various power take-offs. There are options for: two stretchers in the rear for medical evacuation; medium range and commando variants. Inspected in 2002 by QinetiQ, it was subsequently approved for sale to the UK Government. In 2004 the Jordanian Army made its first order, taking initial deliveries from 2006, and now has over 200 units. The Armed Forces of Mauritania have been operating Al-Thalab LRPV since 2006. In 2016 British special forces were seen using the Al-Thalab in Syria.

See also 

 Toyota FJ Cruiser
 List of Toyota engines

References

External links
Toyota Land Cruiser 70 Series global Site
Toyota LandCruiser Data Library on 70 Series

All-wheel-drive vehicles
70
Military light utility vehicles
Compact sport utility vehicles
Military trucks
Cars introduced in 1984
1990s cars
2000s cars
2010s cars
2020s cars